Bihag (International title: The Silent Thief / ) is a 2019 Philippine television drama crime series broadcast by GMA Network. Directed by Neal del Rosario, it stars Max Collins. It premiered on April 1, 2019 on the network's Afternoon Prime line up replacing Inagaw na Bituin. The series concluded on August 16, 2019 with a total of 98 episodes. It was replaced by Prima Donnas in its timeslot.

Originally titled as Ganti and later Stolen, it was later renamed to Bihag. The series is streaming online on YouTube.

Premise
The lives of married couple, Jessie and Brylle will be disturbed after their son is abducted. Jessie is dissonant finding her son, because she cannot believe why someone would hurt her family.

Cast and characters

Lead cast
 Max Collins as Jessica "Jessie" Medina-Alejandro

Supporting cast
 Mark Herras as Larry Pineda
 Jason Abalos as Brylle Alejandro
 Neil Ryan Sese as Amado Anzures
 Sophie Albert as Regina Marie "Reign Marie" Sison 
 Raphael Landicho as Ethan James M. Alejandro
 Glenda Garcia as Emilou Alejandro
 Nicole Kim Donesa as Martha Dampit
 Biboy Ramirez as Gino "Gene" Chavez
 Jade Lopez as Liza Chavez

Guest cast
 Celine Juan as Gigi 
 Andrew Ferrer as Drew
 Joseph Izon as Reyes
 Luri Vincent Nalus as Boy
 Star Orjaliza as Marijoy
 Mike Agassi as Nico

Production
Kim Domingo was initially hired for a role, but later backed out during pre-production due to the character's role. Sophie Albert took her role.

Ratings
According to AGB Nielsen Philippines' Nationwide Urban Television Audience Measurement People in television homes, the series got its highest rating on May 22, 2019 with an 8% rating.

Accolades

References

External links
 
 

2019 Philippine television series debuts
2019 Philippine television series endings
Filipino-language television shows
GMA Network drama series
Philippine crime television series
Television shows set in the Philippines